Ahititi is a locality in Taranaki, New Zealand. State Highway 3 runs through it. Mokau is 23 km to the north, Mimi is 26 km to the south-west, and Kotare is 16 km to the east. The Tongaporutu River flows through the area and into the North Taranaki Bight at Tongaporutu to the northwest. The name means "fire for cooking" (ahi) "muttonbirds" (titi).

Ahititi and its surrounds in Meshblock 1552600 had a population of 84 people in 33 households in the 2013 New Zealand census.

Education

Notes

Further reading

 
 
 
 

Populated places in Taranaki
New Plymouth District